Mount Barrington, a mountain that is part of the Mount Royal Range, is located on the Barrington Tops plateau in the Mid-Coast Council within New South Wales, Australia and has an elevation of  above sea level.

Now the remnants of a volcano, Mount Barrington, formerly the Barrington Volcano, erupted near its present peak between 44 and 54 million years ago. The eruption caused a  basalt flow, which covered much of the Barrington Tops plateau.

The extensive rainforests in the area grow on much of the resultant red/brown soils. Gemstones such as zircon, sapphire, sapphirine and ruby were formed from the volcano. Nearby Careys Peak is considered a vent in this extinct shield volcano. The surrounding area is covered by sub alpine Snow Gum woodland, with rainforest on the escarpment edge and in fire free gullies.

See also 

 List of mountains in New South Wales

References 

Barrington
Hunter Region